Directorate of Language Planning and Implementation (DLPI) is a directorate of the Government of Manipur in charge of the language planning and the implementation of policies of Meitei language (officially known as Manipuri language) as well as other indigenous vernaculars of Manipur.

The 1st anniversary of the Directorate of Language Planning & Implementation coincided with 18th Meitei Language Day (officially called Manipuri Language Day), the annual commemorative celebration of Meitei language's inclusion in the Eighth Schedule to the Indian Constitution.

Though Meitei Language Day (officially called Manipuri Language Day) is annually observed even before the establishment of the Directorate of Language Planning & Implementation, the Directorate is serving as one of the key organisers of the very annual event after just its inception in 2013.

Language planning and implementation works 
During November 2013, in collaboration with the Central Institute of Indian Languages (CIIL), MHRD, Government of India, Mysore, the Department of Language Planning and Implementation organised a five-day training programme on Natural Language Processing (NLP) in relation to Meitei language in Lamphelpat. The event took up the initiatives for the provision of the very essential boost for Meitei language and for "building of co-opera" in the Linguistic Data Consortium of Indian Languages (LDCIL). Major significant tasks discussed and highlighted during the event were machine translation for Meitei language documents; Optical Character Recognition (OCR) for Meitei language spell checker, transcription (and transliteration) of Bengali script into Meitei script and vice versa. The event's main objective was to set up "building of co-opera" containing millions of Meitei language words, phrases, word meanings, words' spelling checker in computers. 
Experts and scholars of socio-linguistic groups working on Meitei literature, including the Manipuri Sahitya Parishad (MSP), Culture Forum Manipur, KALAM, MEELAL, etc. also participated in the event. 
The training program event was the first step in forwarding the development of Meitei language by the Directorate of Language Planning and Implementation.

During May, 2014, the Directorate of Language Planning and Implementation organised a 10-day workshop on terminology building for Meitei language (officially known as Manipuri language) in the Multipurpose Hall of SCERT, Lamphelpat. Experts including professors of various departments of Botany, Chemistry, Economics, Geography, Physics, Zoology and Meitei language from different universities took part in the workshop. The purpose of the event was the imparting of education upto graduation level of the mentioned general subjects in Meitei language medium. It was in accordance to the provisions of the "Manipur Official Language Act, 1979". The main aim of the event was to discover as many as 30,000 Meitei language terminologies to replace English terminologies used in three subjects, viz. Physics, Economics and Geography, after which all the practicable Meitei terminologies could be added to a Meitei lexicon.

During September 2014, the Directorate of Language Planning and Implementation organised another 10-day workshop at the conference hall of the directorate in Old Lambulane town, Imphal West district. The event was participated by 35 university and college teachers. Translations of different books of various subjects including anthropology, commerce, economics, history, home science, philosophy, political science and sociology into Meitei language, for educational standards from Class XI up to graduation level, were carried out.

During March 2016, the Directorate of Language Planning and Implementation organised a symposium on the theme "Multiculturalism and Aspects of Translation". The venue for the event was in the Manipur Press Club. The symposium had two sessions. In one session, various resource persons presented papers on different topics for the promotion of Meitei language. In another session, resource persons presented research papers to sharply increase the level of the translation works to impart the knowledge and understanding of Meitei language to people living outside the state of Manipur.

During June 2017, the Directorate of Language Planning and Implementation organised a 10-day Meetei Mayek orientation programme for college teachers who teach Meitei language as a subject. The venue for the event was at the DM College of Arts, Imphal. In the event, Thokchom Radheshyam Singh, the then Education, Labour & Employment Minister, launched Meitei language textbooks (in Meitei Mayek) for the academic degree in Bachelor of Arts on e-book formats.

During April 2018, the Directorate of Language Planning & Implementation organised a three-day conference on the topic "Classical Language Status in respect of Manipuri Language" at the conference hall of Manipur State Guest House, Sanjenthong, Imphal. Langpoklakpam Jayantakumar Singh, the then Minister of Art & Culture Department of the Government of Manipur, as a Chief Guest of the event, assured that he will take a leading role in the efforts of attaining classical language status for Meitei language for the sake of future generations. Thokchom Radheshyam Singh, the then minister of the Education Department of the Government of Manipur, as a President of the event, while calling upon the people to involve in the movement for inclusion of Meitei language in the classical language list.

Issues and Demands

November 2020 
During November 2020, in response to the then education minister's statement of introducing Sanskrit as a subject in selected schools and colleges of Manipur, there were strong criticism of the minister's plan from the sides of various social organizations. A spearheading social organization, "MEELAL" (Meetei Erol Eyek Loinasillol Apunba Lup) demanded the Government of Manipur that there should be state language departments other than Directorate of Language Planning and Implementation (DLPI) and the concerned authorities should first work on the development and the promotion of Manipur's indigenous languages and Meetei Mayek writing system before promoting other languages.

January 2022 
During January 2022, in a meeting with the Wakhallon Mannaba Apunba (WAMA), Leishemba Sanajaoba expressed that he was extremely unsatisfied with the negligence of the Department of Language Planning and Implementation in the documentation works for inclusion of Meitei language among the classical languages. The WAMA expressed that such negligence of the Language Department will make the efforts of Sanajaoba, of raising his voice in the Rajya Sabha, useless. 
The WAMA demanded the Government of Manipur for the change of the present director of Department of Language Planning and Implementation. According to the WAMA, Chitra, the present director, is unfit to hold the very directorial position because of her neglecting and irresponsible behaviours.

Notes and References

External links 
 
 
 

Meitei language
Government of Manipur
Government of India
Academia in India
Academic works about linguistics
Language education
Language law
Language policy
Language reform
Language regulators
Language reformers
Languages of Manipur
Languages of India
Linguistics organizations
Linguistics projects
Linguistic research
Linguistic research in India
Linguistic research institutes in India
Linguistics works
Official languages
Research and development in India
Research in India
Research institutes in India
Sociolinguistics works
Standard languages
Works about language